Alfred Thomas Yeoumans (4 November 1876 – 29 September 1955) was a British racewalker. He competed in the men's 3500 metres walk at the 1908 Summer Olympics.

References

External links

1876 births
1955 deaths
Athletes (track and field) at the 1908 Summer Olympics
British male racewalkers
Olympic athletes of Great Britain